The 2008 Vladikavkaz bombing took place on a routed taxicab, which was unloading passengers at a market in Vladikavkaz, North Ossetia, Russia on November 6, 2008 killing 12 and injuring 41. The bombing was committed by a female suicide bomber. On November 15, the attack was claimed by the Riyad-us Saliheen Brigade of Martyrs, a unit of the militant Caucasus Emirate group.

See also
List of terrorist incidents in 2008
1999 Vladikavkaz bombing
2010 Vladikavkaz bombing

References

21st-century mass murder in Russia
Operations of the Second Chechen War
History of North Ossetia–Alania
Mass murder in 2008
Suicide bombings in Russia
Terrorist incidents in Russia in 2008
November 2008 events in Russia
Marketplace attacks

Suicide bombings in 2008
Terrorist incidents in Vladikavkaz